2000–01 was the second season that Division 1 functioned as the third-level of ice hockey in Sweden, below the second-level Allsvenskan and the top-level Elitserien (now the SHL).

Format 
The league was divided into four regional groups. In each region, the top teams qualified for the Kvalserien till Allsvenskan, for the opportunity to be promoted to the Allsvenskan. The bottom teams in each group were forced to play in a relegation round against the top teams from Division 2 in order to retain their spot in Division 1 for the following season. These were also conducted within each region.

Season

Northern region

First round

Group A

Group B

Playoffs 
 Clemensnäs HC - AIK Härnösand 5:5/4:5
 Örnsköldsviks SK defeated Tegs SK

Relegation

Western region

First round

Group A

Group B

Allettan

Qualification round

Group A

Group B

Final round

Group A

Group B

Relegation

Group A

Group B

Eastern region

First round

Group A

Group B

Allettan

Qualification round

Relegation

Southern region

First round

Group A

Group B

Allettan

Qualification round

Group A

Group B

Final round

Group A

Group B

Relegation

Group A

Group B

External links 
 Season on hockeyarchives.info

3
Swedish Division I seasons